Palestinian football clubs have participated in Asian football competitions since 1998, when Khidmat Rafah took part in the Asian Club Championship.

Overall records

Last updated: 12 May 2015

By country

AFC Cup

AFC President's Cup

Asian Club Championship

Asian Cup Winners' Cup

Association football in Asia
Football in the State of Palestine
Asian football clubs in international competitions